Santa Rita is a town and a municipality in the Honduran department of Yoro. The Humuya River passes through it.

The town of Santa Rita has a population of 15,050 (2020 calculation).

In 1684, it was a hamlet called Benque La Laguneta. It later became the village of Santa Rita El Negrito. The place was established as a town in 1959 with part of the municipality of El Negrito.

Demographics
At the time of the 2013 Honduras census, Santa Rita municipality had a population of 20,301. Of these, 89.73% were Mestizo, 9.20% White, 0.77% Black or Afro-Honduran, 0.17% Indigenous and 0.12% others.

References

Municipalities of the Yoro Department